Abakanovo is a rural locality (a village) in Semyonkovskoye Rural Settlement of Vologodsky District, Russia. The population was 2 as of 2002.

Geography 
Abakanovo is located 12 km north of Vologda (the district's administrative centre) by road. Petrakovo is the nearest rural locality.

References 

Rural localities in Vologodsky District